Vino was a VNC server for the GNOME desktop environment, the GNOME developers now recommend using "gnome-remote-desktop" instead.

Configuration up to version 3.8.0 was via the vino-preferences program. This was removed from the packages after that version, since the gnome-control-center could then be used alternatively to control settings.

However, Vino is also useful in some other Linux distributions, which may not use GNOME desktop; and where gnome-control-center is not present: this leaves those distributions with no preference editor. For these distributions, (Lubuntu is one example, being based on LXDE, not GNOME), the alternative configuration manager tool dconf-editor is recommended (sudo apt install dconf-editor to install). The VNC settings can then be accessed under org -> gnome -> desktop -> remote-access using that tool.

References

External links

 Vino Wiki Page on wiki.gnome.org
 Vino git on git.gnome.org
 Vino roadmap on wiki.gnome.org

GNOME Applications
Remote desktop software that uses GTK
Free software programmed in C